Thomas Boylston (January 26, 1644-1695) was a prominent early-American doctor and patriarch of the influential Boylston family of Massachusetts.  

Thomas Boylston was born in 1644 in Watertown, Massachusetts to Thomas Boylston Sr.  He became a surgeon in 1665 and married Mary Gardner and they had twelve children. One of his sons, Zabdiel, taught medicine by the father, followed his professional steps and grew up to be a prominent physician.

He was surveyor of the Muddy River in 1674 and lived at the western end of the Brookline Reservoir which was then a marshy meadow. He lived in Brookline, Massachusetts (Muddy River) near what is now Boylston Street on land from his wife's family. He was the great-grandfather of U.S. President John Adams, through his granddaughter, Susanna.

References

People of colonial Massachusetts
1644 births
1695 deaths
Adams political family